Celebrating Christmas is the second Christmas worship album of contemporary worship music composed of Christmas songs led by Darlene Zschech and the Hillsong Team. The album appeared on the Billboard Top Heatseekers Albums Chart.

Track listing
 "Angels We Have Heard on High"/"Gloria" (traditional by Luke Munns; chorus from "Gloria" by Reuben Morgan) - lead vocals: Darlene Zschech, soprano: Keegan Joyce
 "Joy to the World" (traditional; arranged by Craig Gower & Nigel Hendroff) - lead vocals: Erica Crocker
 "Christmas Time Again" (Barry Southgate) - lead vocals: Barry Southgate
 "O Rejoice" (Mia Fieldes) - lead vocals: Darlene Zschech
 "O Come, O Come, Emmanuel" (instrumental; arranged by Hendroff)
 "O Little Town of Bethlehem" (traditional; arranged by Peter King) - lead vocals: Holly Watson
 "God Rest Ye Merry Gentlemen" (traditional; arranged by Ross Irwin) - lead vocals: Steve McPherson, feat. James Morrison
 "Hark the Herald Angels Sing" (traditional; arranged by Luke-Henri Peipman & Steve McPherson - lead vocals: Barry Southgate, b. Julie Basset, Steve McPherson, Dee Ulurewa, Tulele Faletolu
 "Emmanuel" (Raymond Badham) - lead vocals: Tulele Faletolu
 "What Child Is This" (traditional; arranged by King) - lead vocals: Cindy Larsen
 "Can You Hear?" (David Andrew & Fieldes) - lead vocals: Steve McPherson
 "Saviour Christ the King" (Craig Gower) - lead vocals: Miriam Webster

Personnel 

 Darlene Zschech - worship pastor, executive producer, senior lead vocals, backing vocals
 Steve McPherson - producer, lead vocals, backing vocals
 Erica Crocker - lead vocals, backing vocals
 Barry Southgate - lead vocals, backing vocals
 Holly Watson - lead vocals, backing vocals
 Tulele Faletolu - lead vocals, backing vocals
 Cindy Larsen - lead vocals, backing vocals
 Miriam Webster - lead vocals, backing vocals
 Julie Basset - backing vocals
 Annie McIntosh - backing vocals
 Nathan Phillips - backing vocals
 Dee Uluirewa - backing vocals

References 

Hillsong Music albums
Christmas albums by Australian artists
2005 Christmas albums